Alex Okafor (born February 8, 1991) is an American football defensive end who is a free agent. He was drafted by the Arizona Cardinals in the fourth round of the 2013 NFL Draft. He played college football at Texas, where he earned All-American honors as a junior.

Early years
Okafor was born in Dallas, Texas to a Nigerian father and an African-American mother. His parents met in college at Grambling State University, a historically black university, before settling down in Texas. Okafor attended Pflugerville High School in Pflugerville, Texas, and played for the Pflugerville Panthers high school football team. He also played soccer and basketball and was a stand out in both. Following his senior season, USA Today recognized him as a high school All-American in 2008.

College career
Okafor attended the University of Texas at Austin, where he played for coach Mack Brown's Texas Longhorns football team from 2009 to 2012. He finished his 2011 junior season with 46 tackles and seven quarterback sacks, and was named a first-team All-American as a defensive end by the American Football Coaches Association (AFCA).  He was also a first-team All-Big 12 selection in 2011 and again in 2012.

Okafor was named to the Bronko Nagurski Trophy, Bednarik Award, Lombardi Award, and CFPA Defensive Lineman Trophy watch lists to
start the 2012 season.

Professional career
Okafor was ranked as one of the middle tier pass rushers in the 2013 NFL Draft. He was projected as either a defensive end or linebacker in the NFL.

Arizona Cardinals
Okafor was drafted by the Arizona Cardinals in the fourth round, with the 103rd overall pick in the 2013 NFL Draft. He played in his first game in 2013, recording a special teams tackle before a bicep injury ended his season.

Okafor recorded his first two career sacks in Week 6 of the 2014 season against the Washington Redskins on quarterback Kirk Cousins. He had his first interception in Week 14 on Kansas City Chiefs' quarterback Alex Smith. He ended the season playing in 13 games with 12 starts, recording 30 tackles, 8 sacks, three passes defensed and one interception. During his time in Arizona, he played in 39 games (25 starts), tallying 74 tackles (63 solo), 13.5 sacks, 30 quarterback hits, 18 tackles for loss, four passes defended, one interception (returned for 26 yards), one forced fumble and two fumble recovery.

New Orleans Saints
On March 14, 2017, Okafor signed with the New Orleans Saints. He started the first 10 games of the season, recording a career-high 43 tackles, 4.5 sacks and four passes defended. He suffered a torn Achilles in the team's Week 11 win over the Redskins and was ruled out for the rest of the season.

On March 16, 2018, Okafor re-signed with the Saints on a two-year contract. He started all 16 games in 2018, recording 36 tackles and four sacks.

On February 14, 2019, the Saints voided the final year of Okafor's contract, making him a free agent at the start of the new league year.

Kansas City Chiefs
On March 14, 2019, Okafor signed a three-year, $18 million contract with the Kansas City Chiefs.
In week 7 against the Denver Broncos, Okafor sacked Joe Flacco twice in the 30–6 win. He played in 10 games before suffering a torn pectoral in Week 15. He was placed on injured reserve on December 16, 2019. He finished the season with 22 tackles and five sacks. During his absence, the Chiefs went on to win Super Bowl LIV, their first championship in 50 years. On August 10, 2020, Okafor and the Chiefs restructured his contract to save about $2 million in cap space.

On October 24, 2020, Okafor was placed on injured reserve after suffering a hamstring injury in Week 6. He was activated on November 21, 2020.

Okafor was re-signed on July 20, 2021.

Personal life
Okafor traveled to Kenya during the 2016 offseason with former Texas and Saints teammate Kenny Vaccaro and is involved in community and fundraising efforts to construct a school in the region.

On March 9, 2015, Okafor was arrested for evading arrest on foot and for a misdemeanor warrant for jaywalking in Austin, Texas after he knocked over a pedestrian.

References

External links
Kansas City Chiefs bio
New Orleans Saints bio
Arizona Cardinals bio
Texas Longhorns bio

1991 births
Living people
American football defensive ends
American football defensive tackles
American football linebackers
American people of Igbo descent
American sportspeople of Nigerian descent
Arizona Cardinals players
Igbo sportspeople
Kansas City Chiefs players
New Orleans Saints players
People from Pflugerville, Texas
Players of American football from Texas
Texas Longhorns football players